At , the Treffauer is the third highest mountain in the Kaisergebirge range of the Alps. It lies in the Austrian state of Tyrol.

Location 

The Treffauer rises south of the main ridge and is therefore the most striking mountain in the Wilder Kaiser. Somewhat separated to the north of the Treffauer the long main ridge runs from west to east between the Scheffauer, Sonneck and Zentralkaiser around the Ellmauer Halt. In front of it to the south is the Tuxeck.

Routes 
Amongst mountaineers the Treffauer is considered an arduous, but nevertheless worthwhile and not especially difficult tour. However, Alpine experience, good fitness, dry conditions, sure-footedness and a head for heights are necessary. The designated normal route to the Treffauer begins in Scheffau and runs via the Jägerwirt, the Alpine meadow of the Kaiser Hochalm, the Snow Cirque (Schneekar) and the shaded western flank taking around 4 hours to reach the summit cross. This route is the easiest by far and, unlike the neighbouring Ellmauer Halt, less challenging. Popular, but not to be underestimated is the crossing to the Tuxeck with its succeeding descent to the Grutten Hut. This requires difficult and unsecured climbing sections of up to UIAA grade III to be overcome; in addition there is a high risk of rock falls in the confusing terrain. The Treffauer is one of the few summits in the Wilder Kaiser that does not attract climbers.

References

External links 
 tourd description 

Mountains of the Alps
Mountains of Tyrol (state)
Two-thousanders of Austria
Kaiser Mountains